Maung Maung Swe (born 23 May 1971) is a Burmese politician who currently serves as an Amyotha Hluttaw MP for Mandalay Region No. 9 Constituency. He is a member of National League for Democracy.

Early life and education
He was born on 23 May 1971 in Rakhine State, Burma (Myanmar). He graduated with B.A in History from Dagon University.

Political career
He is a member of the National League for Democracy. In the Myanmar general election, 2015, he was elected as an Amyotha Hluttaw MP and elected representative from Mandalay Region № 9 parliamentary constituency.

References

National League for Democracy politicians
1971 births
Living people
People from Rakhine State